Hollywood station is a train station in Hollywood, Florida, which is served by Tri-Rail and Amtrak. The station is located at 3001 Hollywood Boulevard, just west of I-95 and State Road 9.

History

Seaboard Air Line Railway 

The original station, which is used solely by Amtrak, is a former Seaboard Air Line Railway depot designed in the prevalent Mediterranean Revival style by Gustav Maass of the West Palm Beach architectural firm Harvey & Clarke. Although the first Seaboard passenger train arrived in January 1927, the station did not open until 1928, in what was then a remote area of Hollywood.The station consists of three distinct sections. The southern end of the building contains the passenger station, while the northern end consists of the freight room and docks.  The center section of the station contains the baggage room. Entry into the passenger waiting room is through doors on the southern end.  On the west side of the building is a separate entrance into what was, in keeping with racial segregation laws of the era, the "colored" waiting room; it was converted into railroad offices by the Seaboard in 1963.

Also in 1963, the Seaboard added a large Spanish-style barrel tile canopy to shelter the southern entrance, modifying the architectural details of the two entry porticos. At the same time, the railroad replaced the concrete-etched station signs on either end of the building with copper signs. The station is virtually identical to the Fort Lauderdale Seaboard station to the north.

The station was served by, among other Seaboard trains, the Orange Blossom Special until 1953, and the Silver Meteor beginning in 1939.  Amtrak maintained Silver Meteor service to the station when it took over intercity passenger train service in 1971. Both the Silver Meteor and Amtrak's Silver Star continue to use the station.

Tri-Rail commuter service 
In 1988, through an agreement with CSX Transportation, the successor to Seaboard, the Florida Department of Transportation acquired the station as part of the state's South Florida Rail Corridor. In January 1989, the South Florida Regional Transportation Authority (SFRTA) began using the station as a Tri-Rail stop.  While Amtrak is the long-term lessee of the original station's ticket office, waiting room, baggage room, and platform, and the city of Hollywood is the long-term lessee of the freight room, Tri-Rail uses additional facilities built immediately to north of the old depot.  The station is the southernmost Tri-Rail stop in Broward County.

Due in part to Tri-Rail's presence, Amtrak trains only stop southbound to discharge passengers and stop northbound to receive passengers bound for points north of West Palm Beach.

Station layout 
The station has two side platforms and a station house with parking west of the southbound platform.

Gallery

References

External links 

Hollywood – South Florida Regional Transportation Authority
Hollywood Amtrak/Tri-Rail Station (USA Rail Guide – TrainWeb)
Photograph of station in 1920s
Inaugural run of Silver Meteor arriving at station in 1939

Tri-Rail stations in Broward County, Florida
Amtrak stations in Florida
Seaboard Air Line Railroad stations
Railway stations in the United States opened in 1928
Buildings and structures in Hollywood, Florida
1928 establishments in Florida